Franck Semou (born 25 August 1992 in Copenhagen) is a Danish professional football player, who most recently played as a defensive midfielder for HamKam.

On November 30, 2016, Semou was attacked outside HamKams training ground and beaten in the head with a hammer. Two men, one of them a member of Hells Angels, were later convicted for the attack in the lower courts.

Career
Semou began his career with Kjøbenhavns Boldklub and in summer 2006 joined the youth team of Akademisk Boldklub. On 4 December 2007 left Akademisk Boldklub and signed for Hvidovre IF. Semou debuted for Hvidovre IF team 5 October 2008 against Viborg FF.

International career
He is a former Denmark under-17 national player and a current member of the Danish U19 side.

References

1992 births
Living people
Danish men's footballers
Hvidovre IF players
Senegalese footballers
Kjøbenhavns Boldklub players
Danish people of Senegalese descent
Akademisk Boldklub players
Association football midfielders
Footballers from Copenhagen